Wangnamyen municipality Stadium is a multi-purpose stadium in Wang Nam Yen District, Sa Kaeo Province, Thailand. It is currently used mostly for football matches and is the home stadium of Sa Kaeo F.C.

Football venues in Thailand
Buildings and structures in Sa Kaeo province
Sport in Sa Kaeo province